Agrococcus carbonis is a Gram-positive, non-spore-forming and non-motile bacterium from the genus Agrococcus which has been isolated from soil from a coal mine.

References

Microbacteriaceae
Bacteria described in 2011